Diana Khubeseryan (born 5 May 1994) is an Armenian sprinter. In 2016, she competed in the 200 metres at the European Championships and Rio Olympics, but failed to reach the finals. Khubeseryan started as a swimmer and took up athletics aged 12. She later studied journalism at the Armenian State Institute of Physical Culture and Sport in Yerevan.

References

1994 births
Living people
Place of birth missing (living people)
Athletes (track and field) at the 2010 Summer Youth Olympics
Athletes (track and field) at the 2016 Summer Olympics
Olympic athletes of Armenia
Armenian female sprinters
Olympic female sprinters